The fifth season of the television drama series Wentworth premiered on Showcase in Australia on 4 April 2017, having previously aired on SoHo, and concluded on 20 June 2017. It was executive produced by FremantleMedia's Director of Drama, Jo Porter. The season comprised 12 episodes. The fifth season picks up just days after the death of Bea Smith and is therefore noted as the first season not to feature Danielle Cormack.

Plot 
Following Bea Smith's tragic death at the hands of Joan Ferguson, emotional, psychological and professional shockwaves pound the inmates and staff of Wentworth Correctional Centre. Governor Vera Bennett is under fire from Corrective Services and, with Will on suspension, she is relying more on her deputy Jake, not realising he is now Ferguson's puppet. New top dog Kaz has a challenge to restore order amongst the traumatised inmates, though Sonia remains aloof focusing on her upcoming trial. Liz has to decide if she follows her heart or her head. Doreen struggles with being separated from her son and Boomer supports Maxine as she continues her battle with breast cancer. On the outside, it falls to Franky to break the devastating news about Bea to Allie.

Cast

Regular 
 Nicole da Silva as Franky Doyle
 Sigrid Thornton as Sonia Stevens
 Celia Ireland as Liz Birdsworth
 Shareena Clanton as Doreen Anderson
 Katrina Milosevic as Sue "Boomer" Jenkins
 Robbie Magasiva as Deputy Governor Will Jackson
 Socratis Otto as Maxine Conway
 Tammy Macintosh as Kaz Proctor
 Kate Jenkinson as Allie Novak 
 Bernard Curry as Jake Stewart 
 Kate Atkinson as Governor Vera Bennett
 Pamela Rabe as Joan Ferguson

Recurring 
 Libby Tanner as Bridget Westfall
 Jacquie Brennan as Linda Miles
 Martin Sacks as Derek Channing Acting Governor
 Steve Bastoni as Don Kaplan
 Hunter Page-Lochard as Shayne Butler 
 Sally-Anne Upton as Lucy "Juice" Gambaro
 Charli Tjoe as Tina Mercado
 Ra Chapman as Kim Chang
 Daniielle Alexis as Dana Malouf 
 Zahra Newman as Iman Farah 
 Richard Sutherland as Alan Doyle 
 Bessie Holland as Stella Radic 
 Sophia Katos as Mel Barratt
 Maddy Jevic as Nurse Lee Radcliffe

Episodes

Production 
On 21 July 2016, it was announced that FremantleMedia had renewed Wentworth for a fifth season, set to air in 2017.

Jo Porter, the Director of Drama at FremantleMedia stated, "As season four comes to a close, the audience has witnessed a dangerous shift in the power base at Wentworth which is building to an unmissable conclusion next week. Wentworth has built a reputation for delivering a world with unexpected twists and turns where no character is safe. The season’s end provides a chilling platform for our script producer Marcia Gardner and the writing team to shape the next chapter for our regular characters, along with some new faces in the yard and on the outside. With series producer Pino Amenta at the helm, our ambition to keep lifting the bar and reward our audience both locally and internationally couldn’t be stronger."

Penny Win, the Head of Drama at Foxtel stated, "Wentworth has gone from strength to strength over the past four seasons. Not only is it an international television success story, now showing in 141 territories, it is a ratings blockbuster and fan favourite for Foxtel audiences. We are extremely proud of this long-running drama juggernaut. It was a very easy decision to commission a further season of this brilliantly constructed and crafted program from our production partner FremantleMedia. There is a lot in store both for the women behind bars and those on the outside."

Reception

Ratings

Accolades 

 AACTA Awards
 Nominated: Best Television Drama Series — Wentworth
 Nominated: Best Lead Actress in a Television Drama — Pamela Rabe
 Won: Subscription Television Award for Best New Talent — Zarah Newman  
 Australian Directors Guild
 Won: Best Direction in a TV or SVOD Drama Series — Fiona Banks (for "Belly of the Beast")
 Logie Awards
 Nominated: Most Outstanding Actress — Kate Atkinson  
 Won: Most Outstanding Actress — Pamela Rabe 
 Won: Logie Award for Most Outstanding Drama Series — Wentworth 
 Nominated: Most Outstanding Supporting Actress — Celia Ireland
 Won: Most Popular Drama Program — Wentworth

Home media

References

External links 
 

2017 Australian television seasons
Wentworth (TV series)